Samrajya Lakshmi Devi (ca. 1814– 6 October 1841) was, as the senior wife of King Rajendra of Nepal, a queen consort of Nepal. She was the mother of King Surendra and Prince Upendra. 

Samrajya was the de facto regent from 1839 to 1841. She died of malaria on October 6, 1841.

Life
She was very anxious about the power asserted by the Mukhtiyar Bhimsen Thapa. She harassed the King Rajendra Bikram Shah to put an end to the power of the Mukhtiyar:

References

Books

Nepalese queens consort
1841 deaths
1814 births
Deaths from malaria
19th-century Nepalese people
19th-century Nepalese nobility
Nepalese Hindus